John Grubesic is an American politician and attorney who served as a member of the New Mexico Senate, representing the 25th District as a Democrat.

References

External links
Profile at Project Vote Smart
Profile at Ballotpedia
Campaign contributions at OpenSecrets

New Mexico state senators
Members of the New Mexico House of Representatives
1965 births
Living people